International Missing Children's Day is an international day celebrated on May 25, the same day as the United States' National Missing Children's Day designated by Ronald Reagan in 1983.

Background

Launched in 1998 as a joint venture of the International Centre for Missing & Exploited Children (ICMEC) and the US's National Center for Missing & Exploited Children (NCMEC), the Global Missing Children's Network (GMCN) is a network of countries that connect, share best practices, and disseminate information and images of missing children to improve the effectiveness of missing children investigations.  The Network has 29 member countries: Albania, Argentina, Australia, Belarus, Belgium, Brazil, Canada, Chile, Costa Rica, Ecuador, Germany, Greece, Guatemala, Ireland, Italy, Jamaica, Lithuania, Mexico, the Netherlands, New Zealand, Poland, Portugal, Russia, Serbia, South Korea, Spain, Taiwan, the United Kingdom, and the United States.

Every year on May 25, GMCN members pay respects to International Missing Children's Day, honoring missing and abducted children while celebrating those who have been recovered. Following the 1979 disappearance of 6-year-old Etan Patz in New York City, May 25 was established as Missing Children's Day in the US by President Ronald Reagan in 1983.

In 2001, the tribute spread worldwide. ICMEC coordinates the Help Bring Them Home Campaign in 29 countries, in conjunction with International Missing Children's Day, to spotlight the issue of child abduction around the world, and to suggest to parents some steps they can take to protect their children.

See also 
International child abduction
International child abduction in Mexico
International child abduction in Japan

References

External links 
The Government of Canada Highlights International Missing Children's Day and the Success of "Our Missing Children" Program
Global effort launched to help bring missing children home
International Missing Children's Day

Missing
May observances
Children's Day